Jefferson Township is one of the twelve townships of Jackson County, Ohio, United States.  As of the 2010 census, 3,597 people lived in the township, including 2,685 in its unincorporated areas.

Geography
Located in the southern part of the county, it borders the following townships:
Franklin Township: north
Madison Township: east
Greenfield Township, Gallia County: southeast
Washington Township, Lawrence County: south
Bloom Township, Scioto County: southwest
Hamilton Township: west
Scioto Township: northwest corner

Part of the village of Oak Hill is located in eastern Jefferson Township.

Name and history
Jefferson Township was organized around 1818, and named for Thomas Jefferson, the third President of the United States. It is one of twenty-four Jefferson Townships statewide.

Jefferson Township has the twelfth largest population of people of Welsh descent in the United States, and sixth largest in Ohio.

Government
The township is governed by a three-member board of trustees, who are elected in November of odd-numbered years to a four-year term beginning on the following January 1. Two are elected in the year after the presidential election and one is elected in the year before it. There is also an elected township fiscal officer, who serves a four-year term beginning on April 1 of the year after the election, which is held in November of the year before the presidential election. Vacancies in the fiscal officership or on the board of trustees are filled by the remaining trustees.

References

External links
County website

Townships in Jackson County, Ohio
Townships in Ohio